Hypopacha is a monotypic moth genus in the family Lasiocampidae. The genus was erected by Berthold Neumoegen and Harrison Gray Dyar Jr. in 1893. Its only species, Hypopacha grisea, described by Berthold Neumoegen in 1882, is found in the US states of California and Arizona.

External links

Lasiocampidae
Monotypic moth genera